Stanisław Roch Różewicz (16 August 1924 – 9 November 2008) was a Polish film director and screenwriter. He directed 26 films between 1947 and 1989. His 1967 film Westerplatte was entered into the 5th Moscow International Film Festival where it won a Silver Prize. His 1985 film Woman in a Hat was entered into the 14th Moscow International Film Festival where it won the Silver Prize.

He was a younger brother of Polish poet, dramatist and writer Tadeusz Różewicz.

Selected filmography
 Warsaw Premiere (1951)
 Westerplatte (1967)
 Woman in a Hat (1985)

References

External links

1924 births
2008 deaths
Polish film directors
People from Radomsko
20th-century Polish screenwriters
Male screenwriters
20th-century Polish male writers